N.K.S.T stands for the Nongu u Kristu u i Ser u sha Tar, (Universal Reformed Christian Church), a Christian Reformed church based in Nigeria.

NKST envisions to be a multiethnic Christian community drawn from all nations and cultures of the world and united in the doctrine of Jesus Christ. NKST exists to glorify God through worship and proclamation of the Good News of Salvation to all humanity, and observation of the sacraments as instituted by Jesus Christ, to strengthen the communion of the Saints, to responsibly teach believers and instill self-discipline.

The church has its headquarters at Mkar-Gboko in Benue state but has spread all over Nigeria, and beyond. The members are predominantly the Tiv language-speaking tribe, but also include people from other tribes in Nigeria. It was first introduced in Sai on 17 April 1911.

References

Further reading

Churches in Nigeria